The Franklin D. Roosevelt Four Freedoms Park is a  memorial to Franklin D. Roosevelt that celebrates the Four Freedoms he articulated in his 1941 State of the Union address. It is located adjacent to the historic Smallpox Hospital in New York City at the southernmost point of Roosevelt Island, in the East River between Manhattan Island and Queens. It was originally designed by the architect Louis Kahn in 1974, but funds were only secured for groundbreaking in 2010 and completion in 2012.

History

Context
President Roosevelt made his Four Freedoms speech to the United States Congress in 1941. The Four Freedoms speech has inspired and been incorporated in the Four Freedoms Monument in Florida, the Franklin Delano Roosevelt Memorial in Washington, D.C., and Norman Rockwell's series of paintings called the Four Freedoms.

Roosevelt Island was named in honor of the former president in 1973, and the planners announced their intention to build a memorial to Roosevelt at the island's southern tip. In 2005, William J. vanden Heuvel, a former U.N. ambassador and a founder of the Franklin and Eleanor Roosevelt Institute, launched the effort to get the four-acre park built to Kahn's specifications, gathering more than $50 million in private and public funds. The Franklin and Eleanor Roosevelt Institute subsequently kept the project going over time. Two foundations that became major donors, the Reed Foundation and the Alphawood Foundation, initiated a lawsuit against the corporation that managed the development of the memorial in a dispute over how their contributions should be acknowledged. The foundations said they were promised their names would appear close to the bust. Those responsible for the memorial's construction did not dispute that. Rather, vanden Heuvel said: "Yes, we have a contract that we believe is now a mistake. As we came to the spring of 2012, we understood that we had a work of art, and the forces that represent the artistic and cultural integrity of the project are concerned about preserving that work. The purity and integrity of the Kahn memorial is what made it so stunning."

Construction and opening
Louis Kahn was asked to design the monument in 1972. Four Freedoms Park is one of Kahn's last works. He was carrying the finished designs with him when he died in 1974 at New York City's Pennsylvania Station. After Kahn's death, his designs were continued by Mitchell |Giurgola Architects, who kept to Kahn's original intentions.

An exhibition at Cooper Union in 2005 brought additional attention and helped to advance the project. In 2006, ENYA (Emerging New York Architects) made the island's abandoned southern end the subject of one of its annual competitions.  Groundbreaking took place in 2010. However, the park was tied up in litigation during its construction.

The park was dedicated in a ceremony on October 17, 2012. Tom Brokaw served as master of ceremonies. Participants included former President Bill Clinton, Governor Andrew Cuomo, former Mayor Michael Bloomberg, and relatives of Roosevelt. Cuomo said that "New York became the laboratory of progressive democracy, and F.D.R. was the scientist creating formulas for a broad range of national problems and social ills." He praised vanden Heuvel as a "juggernaut of determination". Clinton noted the memorial's location: "As we look out on this bright new day, we are close to the U.N., which he, more than any other soul, created." Four Freedoms Park became a New York State Park when it opened to the public on October 24, 2012.

Architecture

In a 1973 lecture at Pratt Institute, Kahn said: 

The  park stands at the southernmost point of Roosevelt Island. Looking south, the visitor has a clear view of the headquarters of the United Nations (particularly the United Nations Secretariat Building); to the north of the park is the Queensboro Bridge, which spans the East River. Approaching from the north, the visitor passes between a double row of trees that narrow as they approach the point, framing views of the New York skyline and the harbor. The memorial is a procession of elegant open-air spaces, culminating in a  plaza surrounded by 28 blocks of North Carolina granite, each weighing 36 tons. The courtyard contains a bust of Roosevelt, sculpted in 1933 by Jo Davidson.

At the point, the monument itself is a simplified, roofless version of a Greek temple in granite. Excerpts from Roosevelt's Four Freedoms speech are carved on the walls of this room-like space, which is open to the sky above.

The memorial is constructed entirely in Mount Airy Granite sourced from the North Carolina Granite Corporation. Over  of Mount Airy Granite was used in the memorial's construction. In contrast with the hard granite forms, Kahn placed five copper-beech trees at the memorial's entrance and 120 little-leaf lindens in allées leading up to the monument.

See also
 List of New York state parks
 Presidential memorials in the United States

References

Further reading

 Coming to Light: The Louis I. Kahn Monument to Franklin D. Roosevelt for New York City, an exhibition at Cooper Union. Essays and drawings
 "A Roosevelt for Roosevelt Island" (editorial), New York Times, November 5, 2007, New York Times
 Rago, Danielle. "FDR Finally Comes Home," in The Architect's Newspaper, June 26, 2009
 Ilnytsky, Ula. "Decades late, FDR memorial park dedicated in NYC," October 18, 2009

External links

 
 FDR Four Freedoms Park digital education resource
 NYS Parks website
 Four Freedoms Park (pictures and info in spanish)

Parks in Manhattan
Four Freedoms
Monuments and memorials to Franklin D. Roosevelt in the United States
Roosevelt Island
Louis Kahn buildings
Headquarters of the United Nations
State parks of New York (state)
Monuments and memorials in Manhattan
Protected areas established in 2012
2012 establishments in New York City